Anumula Revanth Reddy (born 8 November 1969) is an Indian politician from Telangana. He is the Member of parliament (MP) in the 17th Lok Sabha, from the Indian National Congress representing the Malkajgiri constituency. He was a two-time Member of the Legislative Assembly (MLA) representing Kodangal constituency from Telugu Desam Party (TDP) in Andhra Pradesh Assembly between 2009 and 2014 and Telangana Assembly between 2014 and 2018. In October 2017, he left TDP and joined Congress. In June 2021, he was appointed the president of Telangana Pradesh Congress Committee.

Early life and education
Revanth Reddy was born on 8 November 1969 at Kondareddy Palli of Mahboobnagar district. He is a graduate in arts. He studied Bachelor of Arts from A. V. College, Osmania University in 1992.

Political career

Early political career 
Revanth Reddy was a member of ABVP while he was a student. In 2006, he contested the local body elections and was elected as ZPTC member from Midjil mandal as an independent candidate.

In 2007, Revanth Reddy was elected as a Member of Legislative Council (MLC) as an independent candidate. Later, he met Telugu Desam Party (TDP) chief N. Chandrababu Naidu and joined the Telugu Desam Party.

Member of Legislative Assembly
In 2009 Revanth Reddy was elected to the Andhra Pradesh Assembly from Kodangal constituency with 46.45% votes as a TDP candidate. He won against the incumbent and five-time MLA Gurunath Reddy of Congress (INC).

He contested 2014 undivided Andhra Pradesh elections and was elected to the Telangana Assembly from Kodangal with a majority of 14,614 votes against Gurunath Reddy. He was elected as the floor leader of Telugu Desam Party in Telangana Legislative Assembly.

On 25 October 2017, TDP removed him as the floor leader of the Telangana TDP after reports surfaced that he would consider joining the Congress party. On 31 October 2017 he joined Congress.

He contested the 2018 Telangana Assembly elections from Kodangal as a Congress candidate and lost to TRS candidate Patnam Narender Reddy, marking his first defeat in any election. On 20 September 2018, he was appointed one of the three working presidents of Telangana Pradesh Congress Committee (TPCC).

Member of Parliament
Revanth Reddy contested the 2019 general elections and won the Lok Sabha seat of Malkajgiri as a Congress candidate by a margin of 10,919 votes and securing 38.63% votes and defeated his nearest rival Marri Rajashekar Reddy of TRS.

In June 2021, he was appointed the president of TPCC replacing N. Uttam Kumar Reddy. He was to take the new role on 7 July.

Electoral statistics

Controversies

Arrest for bribery

On 31 May 2015, Revanth Reddy was arrested by the Anti-Corruption Bureau (ACB) during a sting operation after bribing nominated MLA Elvis Stephenson to vote in favour of the TDP candidate in the Legislative Council election. He was remanded in judicial custody for 14 days. On 15 June 2015, the court extended remand for 15 more days till 29 June 2015. A criminal case under sections of Prevention of Corruption Act and sections 120-B (criminal conspiracy) – read with section 34 (common intention) of Indian Penal Code was registered against him along with two others - Bishop Sebastian Harry and Uday Simha. On 30 June, Telangana High Court gave conditional bail. TDP party members celebrated Revanth Reddy's release on 1 July 2015 with a rally. He is on bail and not allowed to cross Hyderabad without ACB permission.

Personal life 
Revanth Reddy married Geetha, Jaipal Reddy's niece. The couple has a daughter.

References

1969 births
Living people
People from Mahbubnagar district
Telugu Desam Party politicians
Members of the Andhra Pradesh Legislative Council
Andhra Pradesh MLAs 2009–2014
Telangana MLAs 2014–2018
Indian prisoners and detainees
Crime in Telangana
India MPs 2019–present
Indian National Congress politicians from Telangana